List of titles and honours of the British monarch may refer to:
 List of titles and honours of Charles III
 List of historic titles of British monarchs
 Style of the British monarch